Isogona tenuis, the thin-lined owlet, is a moth of the family Erebidae. The species was first described by Augustus Radcliffe Grote in 1872. It is found from Ontario, Wisconsin, Ohio and New Jersey, south to Florida and Texas.

Adults are on wing from May to August in the north and from April to October in the south.

The larvae feed on Celtis species.

References

Boletobiinae
Moths of North America
Moths described in 1872